Angela Bishop  (born 6 September 1967) is an Australian reporter and television presenter who is currently a co-host on Network 10's Studio 10.

Career 
Bishop is currently a co-host on the network's morning program Studio 10.

Bishop commenced her work at Network Ten in 1989.

Bishop made two cameo appearances on American soap opera The Bold and the Beautiful in 2017 and 2018 respectively.

Personal life
Bishop married Peter Baikie in 2005 and they had a daughter in 2007.

In 2016 Baikie was diagnosed with a rare form of cancer. He died in 2017.

Bishop is the daughter of former Australian politician Bronwyn Bishop and former NSW judge Alan Bishop.

Bishop was awarded the Medal of the Order of Australia in the 2021 Queen's Birthday Honours, for "service to entertainment journalism".

References 

Australian television presenters
Australian women television presenters
Living people
Recipients of the Medal of the Order of Australia
1967 births